Scott Blackwell is a Christian dance music artist, generally credited with being the first artist to produce such music for the Christian marketplace. In addition to releasing his own albums, Blackwell has produced many other albums, and has founded several record labels.

Personal life and music career 
Born in Fort Worth, Texas, Blackwell got his start as a disc jockey. He eventually obtained a position supervising MYX Records, a division of Frontline Records.

Upon leaving Frontline, Blackwell founded N•Soul Records. By 1995, he produced eleven projects for N•Soul Records, and had acquired over fifty general market production credits. N•Soul became best known for the Nitro Praise series, which incorporated praise and worship songs to various forms of dance music. Blackwell left N•Soul in 1999, citing concerns about the vision of the company's leadership. He then founded two record labels, to focus on different genres of dance music.

Blackwell continued to perform at clubs, in the greater Los Angeles area.

Solo discography 
 Walk On The Wild Side (1992) (MYX Records) – Reviews: Cornerstone & Cross Rhythms
 1800 Seconds of Motion (1992)
 A Myx'd Christmas (1992) 
 A Myx'd Trip to a Gospel House (1993) 
 Once Upon A Time (1993) 
 A Myx'd Trip to a Gospel House II (1993) 
 The Real Thing (1994) (instrumental) – Reviews: Cross Rhythms & YouthWorker  
 Clubhouse (1997) (N'Soul Records) – Review: YouthWorker 
 In The Beginning: Greatest Hits 1991–1995 (1999) (KMG Records)

Artist collaborations 
Blackwell has production, engineering, remix and/or other credits of music released by the following:

 12th Tribe
 50-40
 Information Society
 Moe Bandy
 Book of Love
 Christafari
 Hank Cochran
 Joy Electric
 Faith Massive
 Georgio
 Resolution
 The Rhythm Saints
 The Emotions
 ZZ Top
 Debbie Gibson
 Jon Gibson (remix of 1991's hit "Jesus Loves Ya" from The Hits) 
 Amber
 Crystal Lewis
 Joe Stampley
 Tommy Page
 Rance Allen
 Missy Elliott
 Paradigm Shift
 Stacey Q
 Taylor Dayne
 Holy Alliance
 Prodigal Sons
 Rubicon 7
 Sozo

References

External links 
 Discdogs credits list
 Profile at Cross Rhythms

Living people
Year of birth missing (living people)
Performers of Christian rock music
Record producers from Texas